The Ford Capri (SA30) is an automobile which was produced by Ford Australia from 1989 to 1994. The launch of the car marked a revival of the Ford Capri name, previously used by Ford of Europe from 1969 to 1986 and Ford USAs, Mercury Division, on their Fox-bodied, Mercury Capri, from 1979 to 1986.

The Australian Capri, codenamed the SA30, was an entry-level convertible, based on Mazda 323 engines and mechanicals that Ford Australia had also used in the Laser. It had a body shell designed by Ghia and an interior by ItalDesign. During development of the Capri, Mazda was developing the MX-5, a vehicle that, although considerably more expensive, was commonly considered its direct competitor. Unlike the MX-5, the Capri was a 2+2 rather than a strict two-seater.

History 

The Australian-built Capri was intended primarily for export to the US. Exports began in 1991, as the Mercury Capri. When the car was new, it had a poor reputation for reliability, although many still exist today perhaps due to the mechanical robustness of the Laser/323 upon which it was based. In particular, the Capri's roof was prone to leaking, due to poor-quality materials being used; although Ford quickly resolved the issue, the car's poor reputation stuck. As a result, the MX-5 was comfortably more popular, particularly as that car was rear-wheel-drive, and enthusiasts were skeptical about the front-wheel-drive arrangement that the Capri used.

Two models were initially offered in the Capri's range: a base model, with a 1.6 L B6-2E SOHC inline-4 engine that produced , and a turbocharged model, which used the 1.6 L B6T DOHC inline-4, which produced . The base model was available with a 5-speed manual transmission or a 3-speed automatic transmission, whilst the turbocharged model only had the manual gearbox. In 1990, the naturally-aspirated 1.6 L B6D DOHC unit, which produced , was added to the range, and this was the only engine available in 1991.

For 1992, the Capri was updated, and given the codename SC; the turbocharged engine was also re-added to the range. An XR2 trim level was also introduced for both engines, whilst the base trim for the naturally-aspirated model was renamed Barchetta, and the base trim for the turbo model renamed to Clubsprint. In 1993, the Capri was updated again, and this time was given the codename SE. Production ended in 1994, after a total of 66,279 Capri convertibles had been built; 10,347 of these were right-hand-drive (RHD) models for the Oceania/Southeast Asia market. 9,787 Capris were sold in Australia, whilst the remaining RHD Capris went to New Zealand and Southeast Asia.

The 1989–94 Capri was assessed in the Used Car Safety Ratings 2006 as providing "worse than average" protection for its occupants in the event of a crash.

References 

Capri
Cars introduced in 1989
1990s cars
Cars of Australia
Convertibles
Front-wheel-drive sports cars
Cars discontinued in 1994